Lucas Nicolás Alario (born 8 October 1992) is an Argentine footballer who plays as a striker for Bundesliga club Eintracht Frankfurt and the Argentina national team.

Club career

Colón
Born in Tostado, Santa Fe, Alario began his career at Colón in his native province. He made his Argentine Primera División debut on 11 June 2011, as a 59th-minute substitute for Cristian Raúl Ledesma in a 0–1 home defeat to Arsenal. His first goal for the club came on 22 March 2014, a fourth-minute penalty for the only goal of a win against Tigre at the Estadio Brigadier General Estanislao López. On 12 May 2015, he netted twice in a 3–2 away win at Defensa y Justicia for Colón's first away win of the season.

River Plate
On 26 June 2015, Alario became River Plate's fourth signing of the season, joining the Buenos Aires-based club on a four-year contract for a fee of 2.25 million US Dollars. He made his debut on 11 July, replacing Fernando Cavenaghi for the final 30 minutes of a 1–1 home draw against Temperley. Eleven days later, as a substitute, he equalised for a 1–1 draw away to Paraguay's Club Guaraní in the second leg of the Copa Libertadores semi-finals, converting a pass from Tabaré Viúdez to send River through 3–1 on aggregate to their first such finals since 1996. On 5 August, in the second leg of the final after a goalless first, he finished Leonel Vangioni's cross at the end of the first half to open the scoring as his team won 3–0 against Tigres UANL.

Eighteen days after River won the continental championship, Alario was sent off in a 2–1 domestic loss to Estudiantes de La Plata. His first league goals for the Millonarios came in the form of a hat-trick on 6 September, in a 4–1 win away to Nueva Chicago. On 31 October, as a 55th-minute substitute for Nicolás Bertolo, he scored the only goal in a win at Vélez Sarsfield.

On 16 December, in the semi-finals of the 2015 FIFA Club World Cup in Osaka, Alario headed the only goal to defeat Sanfrecce Hiroshima. Four days later he played the entirety of the final, a 3–0 loss to FC Barcelona.

On August 25, 2016, Alario scores again finishing the game and yet another international title with River Plate in Buenos Aires to take over Recopa Sudamericana 2016. He was rated by many football experts in Argentina as the best striker playing in Argentina.

Bayer Leverkusen
On 22 September 2017, Alario signed for German side Bayer Leverkusen on a five-year deal.

Eintracht Frankfurt 
On 24 June 2022, Alario signed a two year contract with Eintracht Frankfurt.

International career
Alario received his first international call-up for Argentina on 12 August 2016, for matches against Uruguay and Venezuela. Alario had his first appearance on 1 September 2016, coming from the bench replacing Lucas Pratto in the 71st minute during a World Cup Qualifier 2018 match against Uruguay. He scored his first international goal when he netted the fifth in a 6–0 friendly win away to Singapore in June 2017.

Alario was included in the Argentina squad for the 2021 Copa América, but withdrew due to a thigh injury and was replaced by Julián Álvarez.

Career statistics

Club

International

International goals
	 
Scores and results list Argentina's goal tally first.

Honours
River Plate
Copa Argentina: 2015–16, 2016–17
Copa Libertadores: 2015
Recopa Sudamericana: 2016
Suruga Bank Championship: 2015

International
Argentina
Superclásico de las Américas: 2017, 2019

References

External links

 

1992 births
Living people
People from Nueve de Julio Department, Santa Fe
Argentine footballers
Argentina international footballers
Argentine expatriate footballers
Argentine expatriate sportspeople in Germany
Expatriate footballers in Germany
Association football forwards
Club Atlético Colón footballers
Club Atlético River Plate footballers
Bayer 04 Leverkusen players
Eintracht Frankfurt players
Primera Nacional players
Argentine Primera División players
Bundesliga players
Copa Libertadores-winning players
Sportspeople from Santa Fe Province